Founded in 2015, Monrovia Football Academy is the first school in Liberia to combine formal education with football development.

Overview
The Academy provides Liberian boys and girls with academic classes, football training, and life skills lessons to break down gender barriers, improve academic performance, and produce well-rounded leaders. In the 2016-17 school year, the Academy has 30 boys and 20 girls, ages 8–12, in the 3rd, 4th, and 5th grades. Students are at the Academy from 9:00am–6:00pm, Monday-Friday, with football training in the morning, lunch at noon, and academic classes in the afternoon.

Core Programs

Education
The Academy uses football – the most popular sport in Liberia – as a positive-incentive mechanism to encourage student-athletes to attend school and improve academic performance.

Football
The Academy delivers professional coaching and a comprehensive football curriculum that disrupts bad habits, introduces fundamental techniques, and encourages our student-athletes to "think the game" at a high level.

Gender Equality
The Academy uses education and football to break down gender barriers. By studying and training with the boys – and often outperforming them both in the classroom and on the pitch – the Academy's girls have a sense of empowerment that they themselves vocalize.

Notable Supporters

Jill Ellis
Monrovia Football Academy hosted Jill Ellis, the U.S. Women's National Soccer Team Coach and 2015 FIFA Coach of the Year, in Liberia from November 29-December 2, 2016. Ellis was accompanied by Ashlyn Harris, goalkeeper for the U.S. Women's National Soccer Team. Ellis and Harris visited as Sport Envoys sponsored by U.S. Embassy Monrovia, U.S. Soccer, and SportsUnited, which is the Department of State's division devoted to sports diplomacy. Ellis is an official Monrovia Football Academy Ambassador.

Ashlyn Harris
Ashlyn Harris is an American soccer player and FIFA Women's World Cup champion who is currently a goalkeeper for the United States women's national soccer team and Orlando Pride in the National Women's Soccer League. Harris accompanied her U.S. national team coach, Jill Ellis, to Liberia from November 29-December 2, 2016.

References

External links
 Official Website
 International Business Times
 BBC World Service

Football clubs in Liberia
Sport in Monrovia
Education in Liberia
Youth organizations based in Liberia
Educational organizations based in Liberia